LLC Turukhan Airlines is an airline based in Krasnoyarsk, Russia.

History
Established in 1997 as subsidiary of "Yeniseyskij Meridian" airlines, it became independent in 2001. It operates regional scheduled and charter services in Siberian Federal District. In 2015, Turukhan Airlines received the fleet of Katekavia. In 2017, Turukhan Airlines operated 8,743 flights and transported 256,835 passengers.

Fleet

The Turukhan Airlines fleet includes the following aircraft (as of July 2019):

References

External links

Official website 

Airlines of Russia
Companies based in Krasnoyarsk